Gąsierzyno  (formerly ) is a village in the administrative district of Gmina Stepnica, within Goleniów County, West Pomeranian Voivodeship, in north-western Poland. 

The village has a population of 190.

References

Villages in Goleniów County